1933 in professional wrestling describes that year's events in the world of professional wrestling.

List of notable promotions 
Only one promotion held notable shows in 1933.

Calendar of notable shows

Notable events
The nation's top wrestling promoters, including Toots Mondt, Jack Curley, Paul Bowser, Tom Packs, Jess McMahon and others create a new trust, a precursor to the National Wrestling Alliance
February 9 - Ed Don George defeats Henri Deglane to win the a version of the World Heavyweight Championship in Boston
September 21  promoter Salvador Lutteroth holds the first Empresa Mexicana de Lucha Libre (EMLL; "Mexican Wrestling Enterprise") show in Mexico City.

Title changes

EMLL

Debuts
Debut date uncertain
Erik Malmberg
Jack O'Brien
February 20  Bronko Nagurski
September 23  Dientes Hernández

Births
Date uncertain
Keita Meretana
Max Crabtree 
Espanto I (d. 1968)
Randhawa (d. 2013) 
January 4  René Guajardo (d. 1992)
January 6  Mike Lane (d, 2015)
January 12  Ray Stern (d. 2007) 
February 16  Rod Trongard (d. 2005)
March 13  Sam Betts 
March 20  Frank Townsend (died in 1965) 
March 27  Swede Hanson (d. 2002)
April 4  Stan Holek (d. 2015)
April 18  Tank Morgan (d. 1991) 
June 13  Janet Wolfe (d. 1951) 
June 24  Don Kent (d. 1993)
June 28  Boris Malenko (d. 1994)
July 4  Rufus R. Jones (d. 1993)
July 29  Lou Albano (d. 2009)
August 13  Jack Lotz (d. 2020) 
August 29  Dale Lewis (d. 1997)
September 2  Rubén Peucelle (d. 2014) 
September 16  Dick Brower (d. 1997)
October 2  Waldo Von Erich (d. 2009)
October 11  Ripper Collins (d. 1991) 
October 27  Dick Steinborn (d. 2020)
December 2  Gypsy Joe (d. 2016)

Deaths
April 19  Ben Roller (56)
June 3  William Muldoon (81)
July 13  George Kotsonaros (40)
August 5  Fred Beell (57)

References

 
professional wrestling